The sabar is a traditional drum from Senegal that is also played in the Gambia. It is associated with Wolof and Serer people.

The drum is generally played with one hand and one stick. Among its most renowned exponents was the Senegalese musician Doudou N'Diaye Rose.

Sabar is also recognized as the style of music played while using this drum.

See also
Jung-jung
Mbalax
Njuup
Talking drum

References

External links
Sabar page

African drums
Gambian musical instruments
Senegalese musical instruments
Serer culture